The Coloradoan is a daily newspaper in Fort Collins, Colorado. The Coloradoans website is updated throughout the day with breaking news and video coverage of community news in Northern Colorado.

History 

Founded by Joseph L. McClelland in 1873 as Larimer County Express, Fort Collins Newspapers Inc. was established in 1937 when Speidel Newspapers acquired the publication known as The Express-Courier. The Coloradoan moved from its Old Town Fort Collins location to 1212 Riverside Avenue on the city's east side in 1974. Gannett acquired the newspaper when it merged with Speidel in 1977.

In 2004, Gannett began construction on a new $6 million facility on property adjacent to their Riverside site. In June 2005, advertising, circulation, human resources, news and technology staffs moved into 1300 Riverside Avenue.

The News Director of The Coloradoan is Eric Larsen, since June 2017. Previous editors include David Greiling, Michael Limon, Bob Moore, Josh Awtry and Lauren Gustus.

Daily paper 
The Coloradoan focuses on local news in its A section. Section B features content from USA TODAY, including national and international news.

The business section includes local content, wire content and a small sampling of local stocks. 

Sports includes local high school coverage, CSU and semi-pro teams around the area as well as Denver pro teams and national sports.

The Wednesday Taste section focuses on food and drink in Northern Colorado, and Cache -- which is inserted into Thursday's edition -- focuses on entertainment and things to do.

Windsor Beacon
The Coloradoan’s Windsor Beacon is a small newspaper that has served Windsor, Colorado since 1896. The Windsor Beacon supplies Windsor residents with local news and event information every Sunday and Wednesday.

Extra editions 
The Coloradoan printed an extra edition on November 18, 1991, upon the release of Beirut hostage Thomas Sutherland, a Fort Collins resident. The Coloradoans banner headline read "He's Free". The newspaper also published an extra edition on September 11, 2001.

Digital Access 
The Coloradoan website offers local content, an e-newspaper (digital version of the print newspaper), and content from across the USA Today Network. The site features digital storytelling, such as videos, podcasts, interactive maps and timelines. The Coloradoan is also available on Facebook, Twitter, Instagram and Amazon Alexa.

Subscription (digital or print) includes access to the mobile and tablet apps. The apps include customized alerts for news, sports, and entertainment. There is a separate app available that provides a digital version of the print newspaper.

Community involvement 
The Coloradoan hosts events such as Brews and News, Secret Suppers, and food truck festivals. The organization also participates in the USA Today Network's nationwide Storytellers Project.

For Insider-level subscribers, the Coloradoan gives away tickets to local events such as Secret Supper, Community Dinner, Cirque Du Soleil, and Red Rocks Concerts.

References

Further reading
Schmidt, Christine (April 2018). "After big Denver Post layoffs, the Fort Collins Coloradoan thinks beyond local" Neiman Lab.
Yang, Nu and Ruiz, Jesus (March 2018) "10 newspapers that do it right" Editor and Publisher
Heckman, Meg (March 2018) "Used carefully, chatbots can be an asset to newsrooms." Columbia Journalism Review.
Radcliffe, Damon and Ali, Christopher (February 2017) "If small newspapers are going to survive, they’ll have to be more than passive observers to the news" Neiman Lab.
Nelson, Jennifer (April 2017) "How the Coloradoan is experimenting with bots and what they're learning." Reynolds Journalism Institute.

External links 

 
 Gannett subsidiary profile of the Fort Collins Coloradoan

Fort Collins Coloradoan
Fort Collins Coloradoan
Gannett publications